Highway 22 is a highway in the Canadian province of Saskatchewan. The highway is split by a  gap near Fort Qu'Appelle; they are connected by Highways 35 and 10 and functions like an unsigned concurrency, though some maps show it as continuous.

The highway also provides access to Pasqua Lake and Echo Lake of the Fishing Lakes.

Major Intersections 
From west to east:

References

022